Ahmed Nasser Abdullah Al-Quraini (born 14 February 1991) is an Omani international footballer who plays as a right back for Omani club Al-Shabab.

Club career
On 18 June 2014, he signed a contract with Al-Musannah SC.

International career
Ahmed was part of the first team squad of the Oman national football team. He was selected for the national team for the first time in 2012. He made his first appearance for Oman on 8 December 2012 against Lebanon in the 2012 WAFF Championship. He has made appearances in the 2012 WAFF Championship and has represented the national team in the 2014 WAFF Championship.

Career statistics

Honours

Club
With Al-Suwaiq
Oman Elite League (2): 2010–11, 2012–13
Sultan Qaboos Cup (1): 2012
Oman Super Cup (1): 2013; Runner-Up 2010, 2011

References

External links
 
 
 

1991 births
Living people
Omani footballers
People from Saham
Association football defenders
Suwaiq Club players
Al-Musannah SC players
Al-Nasr SC (Salalah) players
Muscat Club players
Al-Shabab SC (Seeb) players
Oman Professional League players
Oman international footballers